Mike Galloway (born 30 May 1965) is a football coach and former player. Galloway played for Berwick Rangers, Mansfield Town, Halifax Town, Heart of Midlothian, Celtic and Leicester City as a midfielder. Born in England, Galloway represented Scotland once in an international match.

Playing career
Galloway was born in Oswestry. He started his career with Berwick Rangers. After spells at Mansfield Town and Halifax Town, he moved to Heart of Midlothian (Hearts) in the autumn of 1987. Galloway's performances for Hearts were a key reason why the Edinburgh side were able to push Celtic all the way during the 1987–88 season.

Celtic manager Billy McNeill signed Galloway in 1989. He made his competitive debut in a 3-1 win at old club Hearts on 12 August. He would be a regular feature in that first year with the club. Despite a weight problem and some inconsistent performances which saw him in and out of the team, he earned a Scotland cap in October 1991.

Coaching career
On 27 April 2011, Galloway was appointed manager at East Of Scotland League Club Coldstream FC for the 2011–12 season. On 15 June 2011, he was appointed manager at Northern Alliance League Club Berwick United for the 2011–12 season. On 22 September 2013, he was appointed manager of East of Scotland League side Eyemouth United.

See also
 List of Scotland international footballers born outside Scotland

References

External links

Since 1888... The Searchable Premiership and Football League Player Database (subscription required)

1965 births
Living people
Scottish footballers
Scotland international footballers
Association football defenders
Berwick Rangers F.C. players
Mansfield Town F.C. players
Halifax Town A.F.C. players
Heart of Midlothian F.C. players
Celtic F.C. players
Leicester City F.C. players
English Football League players
Scottish Football League players
Premier League players
Tynecastle F.C. players
Scotland under-21 international footballers
Sportspeople from Oswestry
Anglo-Scots